Anekdoten is a Swedish progressive rock band, composed of guitarist/vocalist Nicklas Barker, cellist/keyboardist Anna Sofi Dahlberg, bassist/vocalist Jan Erik Liljeström and drummer Peter Nordins. They are notable for the use of the mellotron and their heavy sound dominated by a pounding bass guitar. Their music is associated with the tradition of 1970s progressive rock music, especially that of King Crimson.
Since 2015 former The Church guitarist Marty Willson-Piper has been touring with the band.

Discography

Studio albums 
 Vemod (1993)
 Nucleus (1995)
 From Within (1999)
 Gravity (2003)
 A Time of Day (2007)
 Until All the Ghosts Are Gone (2015)

Compilations 
 Chapters (2009)

Live albums 
 Live EP (1997)
 Official Bootleg: Live in Japan (1998)
 Waking the Dead, Live in Japan 2005 (2005)

Morte Macabre 
In 1998, Nicklas Barker and Peter Nordins of Anekdoten, along with Stefan Dimle (Landberk, Paatos) and Reine Fiske (Landberk, Morte Macabre, Paatos, The Guild) released the album Symphonic Holocaust. The album mostly consists of covered themes from horror movies, such as Cannibal Holocaust and Rosemary's Baby. The music is instrumental and characterised by improvisation and heavy use of mellotron and synthesizers.

My Brother the Wind 
Nicklas Barker has since 2010 been involved in a side project called My Brother The Wind. A debut CD of improvised psychedelic rock entitled Twilight In The Crystal Cabinet was released in May 2010.

References

External links 
[ Allmusic.com: Biography]
Official homepage
Myspace
2010 interview with Nicklas Barker on Prog Sphere

Swedish progressive rock groups
Swedish psychedelic rock music groups
Musical groups established in 1991
1991 establishments in Sweden